From March 10 to May 19, 1936, voters of the Republican Party chose its nominee for president in the 1936 United States presidential election. The nominee was selected through a series of primary elections and caucuses culminating in the 1936 Republican National Convention held from June 9 to June 12, 1936, in Cleveland, Ohio.

Although many candidates sought the Republican nomination, only two, Governor Alfred Landon and Senator William Borah, were considered to be serious candidates. 

While favorite sons County Attorney Earl Warren of California, Governor Warren E. Green of South Dakota, and Stephen A. Day of Ohio won their respective primaries, the 70-year-old Borah, a well-known progressive and "insurgent," carried the Wisconsin, Nebraska, Pennsylvania, West Virginia, and Oregon primaries, while also performing quite strongly in Knox's Illinois and Green's South Dakota. However, the party machinery almost uniformly backed Landon, a wealthy businessman and centrist, who won primaries in Massachusetts and New Jersey and dominated in the caucuses and at state party conventions.

Schedule and results

Candidates

Major candidates 
These candidates participated in multiple state primaries or were included in multiple major national polls.

Favorite sons
The following candidates ran only in their home state's primary or caucus for the purpose of controlling its delegate slate at the convention and did not appear to be considered national candidates by the media.

 Businessman Stephen A. Day of Ohio
 Former Governor Warren Green of South Dakota
 Alameda County District Attorney Earl Warren of California

Declined to run 
The following persons were listed in two or more major national polls or were the subject of media speculation surrounding their potential candidacy, but declined to actively seek the nomination.
 
 Senator Lester J. Dickinson of Iowa (ran for re-election instead)
 Former President Herbert Hoover of California
 Former Governor Frank Lowden of Illinois
 Senator Arthur Vandenberg of Michigan

Polling

National polling

Convention

With Knox's candidacy withdrawing in order to become Landon's selection for Vice President, and Day, Green, and Warren releasing their delegates, Landon's victory was assured.

See also
1936 Democratic Party presidential primaries

References